Bill Berry (born 1958) is an American drummer, formerly of the band R.E.M.

Bill Berry may also refer to:

Bill Berry (Australian footballer) (born 1957), Australian rules footballer in the VFL
Bill Berry (basketball) (born 1942), American basketball coach, who served two games as head coach of the Chicago Bulls
Bill Berry (director), Broadway director
Bill Berry (folk singer) (1934–2019), Australian folk singer
Bill Berry (footballer, born 1904) (1904–1972), English footballer in the 1920s and 1930s
Bill Berry (footballer, born 1882) (1882–1943), English footballer
Bill Berry (trumpeter) (1930–2002), American jazz trumpeter

See also
William Berry (disambiguation)